Hylophila is a genus of flowering plants from the orchid family, Orchidaceae. It contains 7 known species, native to Southeast Asia, New Guinea, and Melanesia.

Hylophila cheangii Holttum - Borneo, Peninsular Malaysia
Hylophila gracilis Schltr. - New Guinea, Solomons, Bismarcks
Hylophila lanceolata (Blume) Miq. - Thailand, Peninsular Malaysia, Borneo, Sumatra, Java, Lesser Sunda Islands, Philippines  
Hylophila mollis Lindl. - Borneo, Peninsular Malaysia, Sumatra
Hylophila nipponica (Fukuy.) T.P.Lin - Taiwan
Hylophila orientalis Schltr. - New Guinea
Hylophila rubra Ames - Philippines

See also 
 List of Orchidaceae genera

References 

  (2003). Genera Orchidacearum 3: 105 ff. Oxford University Press.
  2005. Handbuch der Orchideen-Namen. Dictionary of Orchid Names. Dizionario dei nomi delle orchidee. Ulmer, Stuttgart

External links 
 

Cranichideae genera
Goodyerinae